Lijun International Pharmaceutical (Holding) Co., Limited is a Wanchai, Hong Kong-based investment holding company with two pharmaceutical business segments:

Business segments
 manufacturing and selling of intravenous infusion solution
 manufacturing and selling of antibiotics and others

The Group was listed on Hong Kong Stock Exchange in December 2005 (stock code: 2005). 

The Group is engaged in the research, development, manufacturing and selling of a wide range of finished medicines and bulk pharmaceutical products to hospitals and distributors, including antibiotics, intravenous infusion solution, non-antibiotics finished products, bulk pharmaceuticals and health care product.

Subsidiaries
The Company’s subsidiaries include:

 New Orient Limited (New Orient) in Hong Kong
 Shijiazhuang No. 4 Pharmaceutical Co., Limited, intravenous infusion solution manufacturer in Hebei Province (acquired in June 2007)
 Xi’an Lijun Pharmaceutical Co., Limited (Xi’an Lijun), engaged in manufacturing pharmaceuticals in Shaanxi Province
 Shenzhen Lijun Pharmaceutical Co., Limited, engaged in manufacturing pharmaceuticals in Guangdong Province.

The Company is the largest domestic manufacturer of macrolide antibiotics, with a leading position for its intravenous infusion solution products in high-end hospital market. 

Facing more merger and acquisition opportunities from medical reform in China, the Group is positioned for continuous mergers and acquisitions to promote its growth.

External links
Lijun (Official website)
Xi'an Lijun website

Pharmaceutical companies of Hong Kong
Companies listed on the Hong Kong Stock Exchange
Holding companies established in 2004
Pharmaceutical companies  established in 2004